The Governor of Jujuy is a citizen of Jujuy Province, in Argentina, holding the office of governor for the corresponding period. The governor is elected alongside a vice-governor. Currently the governor of Jujuy is Gerardo Morales.

Governors since 1983

See also
 Legislature of Jujuy

References

Jujuy Province
Jujuy Province